The Second Polish Republic adopted the March Constitution on 17 March 1921, after ousting the occupation of the German/Prussian forces in the 1918 Greater Poland Uprising, and avoiding conquest by the Soviets in the 1920 Polish-Soviet War. The Constitution, based on the Constitution of the Third French Republic, was regarded as very democratic. Among others, it expressly ruled out discrimination on racial or religious grounds. It also abolished all  royal titles and state privileges, and banned the use of blazons.

It was partially adjusted by the 1926 August Novelization, and superseded by the Polish Constitution of 1935 (April Constitution).

References

External links 
  Full text of the March Constitution 
  translation of the March Constitution

1921 in law
1921 in Poland
Constitutions of Poland
Poland, March
Legal history of Poland
1921 documents